Pârâul Fagului may refer to:

 Pârâul Fagului (Ilva)
 Pârâul Fagului (Bistrița)